Lesbian, gay, bisexual, and transgender (LGBT) persons in the U.S. state of South Dakota may face some legal challenges not experienced by non-LGBT residents. Same-sex sexual activity is legal in South Dakota, and same-sex marriages have been recognized since June 2015 as a result of Obergefell v. Hodges. State statutes do not address discrimination on account of sexual orientation or gender identity; however, the U.S. Supreme Court's ruling in Bostock v. Clayton County established that employment discrimination against LGBT people is illegal under federal law.

Law regarding same-sex sexual activity
Prior to European settlement in the 18th and 19th centuries, there were no known legal or social punishments for engaging in homosexual activity. Perceptions toward gender and sexuality among the Native Americans were different to that of the Western world. Several had traditions of "third gender" people (nowadays also called "two-spirit") who would dress and act as the opposite gender, perform tasks associated with the opposite gender and be fully recognized as such by the members of the tribe. Among the Dakota people, male-bodied people who act as female are known as winkta, and as wíŋkte
among the Lakota people.

In 1862, the Dakota Territory, which included modern-day North and South Dakota, enacted a criminal ban on heterosexual and homosexual sodomy, which was defined as "crimes against nature". The ban prohibited anal intercourse, regardless of whether the act was committed in private and consensual. Punishment could vary from one year in jail to life imprisonment. In 1877, the maximum penalty was reduced to ten years' imprisonment. In 1910, the definition of sodomy was expanded to include fellatio after State v. Whitmarsh.

In 1976, private, adult, consensual and non-commercial acts of sodomy were legalized with an age of consent set at thirteen years. The age of consent was later raised to fifteen years.

Recognition of same-sex relationships

South Dakota voters adopted a constitutional amendment in November 2006 that defines marriage as the union of a man and a woman and prohibited the recognition of same-sex relationships under any other name, such as civil unions and domestic partnership agreements. Similar restrictions appear in the state statutes as well.

On June 26, 2015, same-sex marriage became legal in the state of South Dakota and all of the United States due to the Supreme Court ruling of Obergefell v. Hodges.

Rosenbrahn v. Daugaard
On May 22, 2014, six same-sex couples filed a federal lawsuit against South Dakota officials seeking the right to marry and recognition of marriages performed in other jurisdictions. The suit, Rosenbrahn v. Daugaard, was brought by Minneapolis civil rights attorney Joshua A. Newville, who filed a similar lawsuit on behalf of seven same-sex couples in North Dakota on June 6, 2014. U.S. District Court Judge Karen Schreier heard arguments on October 17. The state defendants argued she was bound by the Eighth Circuit's decision in Citizens for Equal Protection v. Bruning (2006), which the plaintiffs said did not address the questions they were raising in this case. On November 12, Judge Schreier denied the defense's motion to dismiss. She found Baker is no longer valid precedent and that Bruning did not address due process or the question of a fundamental right to marry. She dismissed the plaintiffs' claim that South Dakota violated their right to travel. On January 12, 2015, she ruled for the plaintiffs, finding that South Dakota was depriving them of their "fundamental right to marry". She stayed implementation of her ruling pending appeal. On February 10, the plaintiffs asked her to lift the stay, citing the U.S. Supreme Court's denial of a stay in Alabama cases the previous day. Two days later, they requested an expedited response to that request.

Following the decision of the U.S. Supreme Court in Obergefell v. Hodges on June 26, 2015, which held that the denial of marriage rights to same-sex couples is unconstitutional, the state defendants asked the Eighth Circuit to vacate the district court decision and dismiss the case as moot. The plaintiffs on July 1 opposed that request, citing statements by the Attorney General that county officials were responsible individually for interpreting Obergefell. They asked the Eighth Circuit to order the district court to lift its stay. On June 26, Attorney General Marty Jackley said that: "Because we are a nation of laws the state will be required to follow the Court's order that every state must recognize and license same-sex marriage." But some reports said he indicated that local officials would determine whether or how soon to issue marriage licenses to same-sex couples.

Adoption and parenting
South Dakota does not specify laws about adoption by single individuals and married same-sex couples. Lesbian couples have access to assisted reproduction services, such as in vitro fertilization. State law recognizes the non-genetic, non-gestational mother as a legal parent to a child born via donor insemination, but the parents are required to be married. Male gay couples may also undertake gestational and traditional surrogacy arrangements. Courts may declare both intended parents as the legal parents of the child in a pre-birth order.

South Dakota law permits adoption agencies to choose not to place children in certain homes if it would violate the agency's religious or moral convictions. This law, known as S.J. 746, passed into law in May 2017.

Discrimination protections

No provision of South Dakota law explicitly addresses discrimination on the basis of sexual orientation or gender identity.

The county of Oglala Lakota, and the cities of Sioux Falls, and Vermillion prohibit discrimination against county/city employees on the basis of sexual orientation and gender identity. Others including Minnehaha County, Spearfish and Watertown prohibit discrimination against county/city employees on the basis of sexual orientation only.

In March 2018, the city of Brookings became the first jurisdiction in South Dakota to enact a comprehensive anti-discrimination ordinance covering sexual orientation and gender identity, banning discrimination against public and private employees, in housing and in public accommodations (such as restaurants, etc.).

In March 2021, Governor Kristi Noem signed a bill into law allowing businesses to deny goods or services to LGBT people and others based on the owners' "purpoted religious beliefs".

Bostock v. Clayton County

On June 15, 2020, the U.S. Supreme Court ruled in Bostock v. Clayton County, consolidated with Altitude Express, Inc. v. Zarda, and in R.G. & G.R. Harris Funeral Homes Inc. v. Equal Employment Opportunity Commission that discrimination in the workplace on the basis of sexual orientation or gender identity is discrimination on the basis of sex, and Title VII therefore protects LGBT employees from discrimination.

Hate crime law
South Dakota law does not address hate crimes based on gender identity or sexual orientation. However, federal law has covered both categories since 2009, when the Matthew Shepard and James Byrd Jr. Hate Crimes Prevention Act was signed into law by President Barack Obama. Hate crimes committed on the basis of the victim's sexual orientation or gender identity can thus be prosecuted in federal court.

In September 2019, the Oglala Sioux Tribal Council passed hate crime legislation which protects LGBT and two-spirit individuals, with 14 votes in favor, 2 against and 1 abstention.

Transgender rights

Identity documents 
South Dakota allows transgender people to change their legal gender. In order to update a birth certificate, the applicant must submit to the Office of Vital Records a copy of a court order changing their legal name and gender, a copy of the photo ID, an "Application for Birth Record" as well as pay the required fee. The Department of Public Safety will change the gender marker on a driver's license and state ID card upon receipt of a court order certifying the gender change or a signed affidavit from a licensed physician confirming sex reassignment surgery.

Gender-affirming care for minors 
In February 2023, a bill passed the South Dakota Legislature to ban gender affirming healthcare for trans people under 18 years old. On February 13, the governor signed the bill into law. Transgender minors will lose access to any puberty blockers or hormones that were previously prescribed to them, as Section 6 of the bill says:If, prior to July 1, 2023, a healthcare professional has initiated a course of treatment, for a minor...the healthcare professional may institute a period during which the minor's use of the drug or hormone is systematically reduced. That period may not extend beyond December 31, 2023.The law allows adults to sue their healthcare providers for "injury or damages" caused by receiving gender-affirming care as minors. People can file such lawsuits until age 25, or (if they're over 25) "within three years" of becoming aware that their healthcare professional's "violation" caused "injury or damages".

Three years earlier, on February 10, 2020, a state senate committee had voted down similar legislative proposals, including one that would have criminalized physicians for prescribing hormones and hormone blockers or for performing surgery, and another that would not have made physicians' involvement a crime but would have allowed their patients to sue them if they later felt regret. The committee voted not to pursue it. At that time, similar legislative efforts were underway in Florida, South Carolina, Colorado, Oklahoma and Missouri.

Recognition of students' gender 
In March 2016, Governor Dennis Daugaard vetoed a bill that would have required transgender students to use bathrooms and locker rooms that match their birth sex.

On 12 February 2019, the House passed legislation (known as HB 1108) which would have barred public schools up to grade K-7 (12-13 years old) from instructing students on gender identity and expression. However, the bill failed to pass the Senate before it adjourned sine die on March 29, 2019. Human Rights Campaign reported that the "bill would prevent teachers from being able to acknowledge the transgender identity of people they are teaching about as well as prevent them from being able to support students who identify as transgender."

Sports 
In March 2021, legislation banning transgender individuals from participating in school sports and athletic teams passed the South Dakota Legislature. Similar laws also passed in Mississippi and Idaho. On March 19, Governor Kristi Noem refused to sign the bill into law, opposing portions of the bill that would ban transgender athletes from competing in college sports, worrying such a ban would cause collegiate sporting organizations, such as the National Collegiate Athletic Association, to avoid holding games and tournaments in the state. The Governor did however sign an executive order on banning transgender individuals within female sports. The ACLU has threatened a lawsuit in federal court.

In January 2022, another similar "anti-transgender sports bill" was introduced and passed the South Dakota Senate and is awaiting a vote in the South Dakota House of Representatives. In February 2022, a bill went to the Governor's desk and could be either signed into law or vetoed and also a couple of other bills are still awaiting votes within the legislature. An anti-trans lawmaker went so far as to call transgender individuals "terrorists", which caused immediate outrage.

On February 4, 2022 the Governor signed the bill into law - becomes effective July 1, 2022. 10 US states have similar laws or regulations that legally ban transgender individuals from playing sports, athletics and Olympics within South Dakota.

Public opinion
A 2017 Public Religion Research Institute (PRRI) poll found that 52% of South Dakota residents supported same-sex marriage, while 37% opposed it and 11% were unsure. The same poll also found that 62% of South Dakotans supported an anti-discrimination law covering sexual orientation and gender identity, while 28% were opposed. Furthermore, 49% were against allowing businesses to refuse to serve gay and lesbian people due to religious beliefs, while 36% supported allowing such religiously-based refusals.

Summary table

See also
 LGBT history in South Dakota

References

LGBT rights in South Dakota